The Ibn-e-Qasim Bagh Stadium, originally known as the Old Fort Stadium, is a multi-use stadium in Multan, Pakistan.  It is currently used mostly for cricket and football. It hosted one Test match in 1980. The stadium holds 18,000 and opened in 1975.

Etymology
The stadium is named in honor of Imād ad-Dīn Muḥammad ibn Qāsim ath-Thaqafī (Arabic: عماد الدين محمد بن القاسم الثقفي; c. 31 December 695 – 18 July 715), an Umayyad general who conquered Sindh and Multan regions along the Indus River (now a part of Pakistan) for the Umayyad Caliphate in eighth century.

2014 stampede
On October 10, 2014, at least seven people died and 40 were injured as a result of a stampede at stadium after a speech of cricketer-turned-politician Imran Khan. The Opposition leader alleged that only two gates of the venue were opened at the end of the rally and the lights were also switched off, but this was later denied by the DCO and local authorities.

List of international centuries
One Test century has been scored at the ground. 

Only three ODI centuries have been scored at the ground.

List of international five-wicket hauls

Tests

See also
 List of Test cricket grounds
 Multan Cricket Stadium
 List of stadiums in Pakistan
 List of cricket grounds in Pakistan
 One-Test wonder

References

Test cricket grounds in Pakistan
Football venues in Pakistan
Buildings and structures in Multan
Cricket grounds in Pakistan
1975 establishments in Pakistan
Stadiumpor